Don McKenzie (born 23 March 1939) is a former Australian rules footballer who played 266 senior games for the Essendon Bombers from 1960 to 1974. He played his first match in round 7 of the 1960 season, against Melbourne, at Essendon's home ground, Windy Hill.

Talent
An exceptionally talented "knock" ruckman (who would regularly punch the ball from the centre bounce to centre-half forward), with an extraordinarily high vertical leap.

Employed as an inspector of interstate transport vehicles and their drivers by the Victorian Country Roads Board, McKenzie was strong, tough, and aggressive, and he had the stamina to play hard all day.

He always played far beyond his height and weight, and he regularly outplayed much taller opponents (such as Carlton's Peter "Percy" Jones, St Kilda's Carl Ditterich, and Collingwood's Len Thompson), as well as much heavier opponents (such as Carlton's John Nicholls).

Career
He made his debut for Essendon in 1960, having only played Australian rules football for three years. He went on to play 266 games for Essendon; he played 94 consecutive senior games from 1965 to 1969.

He won premierships in 1962 and in 1965, as well as winning the club's best and fairest in 1966.

He was selected in the Victorian team to play Tasmania in 1967.

He was captain of the Essendon losing Grand Final team in 1968.

He was also selected for the first international tour of "The Galahs" in 1968.

Dispute over player payments
McKenzie captained the club in the 1969 season. He was removed from his captaincy in 1970 when he and four of his teammates, Geoff Gosper, Darryl Gerlach, Geoff Pryor, and Barry Davis, demanded better pay and conditions. Once the issue was resolved (by the time of the second round in 1970), McKenzie was appointed vice captain for 1970 (with Barry Davis appointed captain). According to Mapleston,

Parallel dispute at Collingwood
Two other VFL players, Collingwood's ruckman Len Thompson (later, the 1972 Brownlow Medallist) and its captain Des Tuddenham (later, the captain-coach of Essendon 1972–75), also went on "strike" at that time, and did not train with Collingwood for three weeks. However "both players eventually agreed to the compromise involved in the League's offer, but Tuddenham was stripped of the captaincy".

Retirement
McKenzie played his last game for Essendon firsts in 1974 (aged 35) and following his retirement he was given a testimonial dinner. However, he returned to Essendon in 1978, aged 39, and played an entire season with the Essendon Reserves. In his first Reserves game he has 16 possessions. He was made a life member of the Essendon Football Club in 1969. He served on the club committee from 1981 to 1996, and also as vice-president of the club. After his retirement from football, McKenzie founded Donric Group, a bus transport and tour group with friend Richard Baird.

Notes

References
 Maplestone, M., Flying Higher: History of the Essendon Football Club 1872-1996, Essendon Football Club, (Melbourne), 1996. 
 Ross, J. (ed), 100 Years of Australian Football 1897-1996: The Complete Story of the AFL, All the Big Stories, All the Great Pictures, All the Champions, Every AFL Season Reported, Viking, (Ringwood), 1996.

External links

Champions of Essendon: Don McKenzie Profile

1939 births
Australian rules footballers from Victoria (Australia)
Essendon Football Club players
Essendon Football Club Premiership players
Crichton Medal winners
Living people
Two-time VFL/AFL Premiership players